The 1994 Major League Baseball season began on April 3, but ended prematurely on August 11, 1994, with the 1994–95 Major League Baseball strike, canceling the remaining 669 games of the season. The season started despite the expiration of MLB's previous collective bargaining agreement at the end of 1993. It was the first season played under the current three-division format in each league. It was also the first with an Opening Night game involving two National League teams, which did not become permanent until 1996.

Strike

As a result of a players' strike, the MLB season ended prematurely on August 11, 1994. No postseason (including the World Series) was played. Over 260 players were scheduled to exceed $1 million in compensation in 1994. The Minor League Baseball season was played.

Awards and honors
Baseball Hall of Fame
Steve Carlton
Leo Durocher
Phil Rizzuto

Other awards
Roberto Clemente Award (Humanitarian):  Dave Winfield (MIN).
Rolaids Relief Man Award: Lee Smith (BAL, American); Rod Beck (SF, National).

Player of the Month

Pitcher of the Month

Statistical leaders

Standings

American League

National League

 On September 14, the remainder of the major league season was canceled by acting commissioner Bud Selig after 34 days of the players' strike.

Home Field Attendance & Payroll

Television coverage

Events
January 12 – Steve Carlton is elected to the Baseball Hall of Fame by the Baseball Writers' Association of America, receiving almost 96% of the vote. Orlando Cepeda falls seven votes short of the 75% required for election.
February 7 – Basketball superstar Michael Jordan signs a minor league contract with the Chicago White Sox. He is invited to spring training with the team as a non-roster player.
February 25 – The Veterans Committee elects Phil Rizzuto and Leo Durocher to the Baseball Hall of Fame.
April 1–3 – BC Place in Vancouver, British Columbia, hosted an exhibition tournament with the Seattle Mariners, Colorado Rockies, Toronto Blue Jays, and the Montreal Expos participating.
April 4 – At Wrigley Field, Chicago Cubs outfielder Tuffy Rhodes blasts three home runs on Opening Day, defeating New York Mets pitcher Dwight Gooden. Rhodes becomes the first player in major league history to hit home runs in his first three at-bats of the season. In spite of Rhodes' unexpected home run barrage, the Cubs lose the game, 12–8.
April 8 – Kent Mercker of the Atlanta Braves pitches a 6–0 no-hitter against the Los Angeles Dodgers at Dodger Stadium, striking out 10 in the process. For Mercker, it is his first complete game in the Major Leagues. In the first half of the ninth inning, Chan Ho Park comes on to pitch for the Dodgers, becoming the first Korean player to appear in a Major League game.
July 12 – Moisés Alou's walk-off double in the 10th inning gives the National League an 8–7 victory over the American League in the All-Star Game. The NL is now a perfect 9–0 in extra-inning contests. John Hudek of the Houston Astros becomes the first pitcher in major league history to appear in an All-Star Game before recording a major league victory. Fred McGriff, whose two-run home run in the 9th inning tied the score, takes MVP honors.
July 28 – Kenny Rogers of the Texas Rangers throws the fourteenth perfect game in Major League history.
August 11 – The final games of the Major League season are played on this date. The next day, the players' strike begins.  Minor League Baseball games are not affected.
September 14 – The remainder of the Major League season (along with the postseason) is canceled by acting commissioner Bud Selig after 34 days of the players' strike. There will be no World Series for the first time since 1904.

Movies
The following are baseball movies released in 1994:
Major League II
Little Big League
Angels in the Outfield
Baseball: A Film by Ken Burns (TV documentary)
The Scout
Cobb

Deaths
January 8 – Harvey Haddix, 68, All-Star pitcher best remembered for a 1959 game with the Pirates in which he threw 12 perfect innings before losing in the 13th; won 20 games for 1953 Cardinals and earned three Gold Gloves. Member of 1960 Pittsburgh Pirates, who won the World Series.
January 9 – Johnny Temple, 66, All-Star second baseman, primarily for the Cincinnati Reds, who batted .300 three times
January 10 – Chub Feeney, 72, National League president from 1970 to 1986; previously an executive and broadcaster with the Giants
February 12 – Ray Dandridge, 80, Hall of Fame third baseman of the Negro leagues who often batted over .350
March 16 – Eric Show, 37, pitcher who won 100 games for the San Diego Padres and surrendered Pete Rose's record 4,192nd hit
May 9 – Ralph Brickner, 69, pitcher for the Boston Red Sox in the 1950s
June 12 – Jim Brock, 57, coach at Arizona State since 1972 who led the Sun Devils to two College World Series titles (1977, 1981)
June 23 – Marv Throneberry, 62, first baseman for the Yankees, Orioles, Mets, and Kansas City A's
July 14 – César Tovar, 54, outfielder for the Minnesota Twins who in 1968 became the second major leaguer to play all nine positions in a game; had his team's only hit on five occasions
September 5 – Hank Aguirre, 63, All-Star pitcher who led AL in ERA in 1962 with the Detroit Tigers
December 26 – Allie Reynolds, 77, 6-time All-Star pitcher, mainly with the Yankees, who led AL in ERA in 1952 and in strikeouts and shutouts twice; in 1951 was first AL pitcher to throw two no-hitters in same year, and was MVP runnerup in 1952; career .630 winning percentage

References

External links
1994 Major League Baseball season schedule at Baseball Reference

 
Major League Baseball seasons
1994 in American sports